Sarnówka may refer to:

Sarnówka, Kuyavian-Pomeranian Voivodeship, a village in the administrative district of Gmina Lubanie, Włocławek County, Poland
Sarnówka, Greater Poland Voivodeship, a village in the administrative district of Gmina Rawicz, Rawicz County, Poland

See also

 Sarnowa (disambiguation)